Anolis notopholis, the scalyback anole, is a species of lizard in the family Dactyloidae. The species is found in Colombia.

References

Anoles
Endemic fauna of Colombia
Reptiles of Colombia
Reptiles described in 1896
Taxa named by George Albert Boulenger